Great Bay may refer to a water body in the United States:

 Great Bay (New Hampshire), a tidal estuary in southeastern New Hampshire
 Great Bay (New Jersey), a tidal estuary north of Atlantic City
It may refer, also to:

 Great Bay, Tasmania. a locality in Australia
 Great Bay, a videogame location from The Legend of Zelda: Majora's Mask